Ahsan Habib Lincoln is a Jatiya Party (Ershad) politician and the former Member of Parliament of Kushtia-2.

Career
Lincoln was elected to parliament from Kushtia-2 as a Jatiya Party candidate in 1988. He is a politician of the Jatiya Party (Zafar) fraction.

Lincoln contested the 2018 election as a candidate of Bangladesh Nationalist Party from Kushtia-2.

References

Jatiya Party politicians
Living people
4th Jatiya Sangsad members
Year of birth missing (living people)